This is a list of members of the Victorian Legislative Assembly from 1935 to 1937, as elected at the 1935 state election.

 On 29 January 1936, the UAP member for Allandale, Thomas Parkin, died. Labor candidate Patrick Denigan won the resulting by-election on 21 March 1936.
 On 22 February 1936, the Country member for Rodney, John Allan, died. Country candidate William Dunstone won the resulting by-election on 18 April 1936.
 In August 1936, the Country member for Goulburn Valley, Murray Bourchier, resigned to take up an appointment as Agent-General for Victoria in London. Country candidate John McDonald won the resulting by-election on 19 September 1936.
 On 24 August 1936, the Country member for Benalla, Edward Cleary, died. Independent candidate Frederick Cook won the resulting by-election on 3 October 1936.
 On 28 August 1937, the Labor member for Footscray, George Prendergast, died. No by-election was held due to the proximity of the 1937 state election.
 In 1936–1937, six United Australia MPs (Shields, Knox, Maltby, Kirton, Drew, and Macfarlan) formed the "Country and Liberal wing" of the party and shifted to the crossbenches, declaring their unhappiness with the direction of the UAP and asserting their right to support the Dunstan government on measures of which they approved. They remained formally in the party, neither resigning nor being expelled, until the disbandment of the section immediately following the 1937 election.

References

 Re-member (a database of all Victorian MPs since 1851). Parliament of Victoria.

Members of the Parliament of Victoria by term
20th-century Australian politicians